Glenea iridescens is a species of beetle in the family Cerambycidae. It was described by Francis Polkinghorne Pascoe in 1867. It is known from Borneo and Malaysia.

Varietas
 Glenea iridescens var. aerata Aurivillius, 1922
 Glenea iridescens var. rufofemorata Breuning, 1956

References

iridescens
Beetles described in 1867